In genre studies, a coming-of-age story is a genre of literature, theatre, film, and video game that focuses on the growth of a protagonist from childhood to adulthood, or "coming of age". Coming-of-age stories tend to emphasize dialogue or internal monologue over action, and are often set in the past. The subjects of coming-of-age stories are typically teenagers. The Bildungsroman is a specific subgenre of coming-of-age story.

The plot points of coming of age stories are usually emotional changes within the character(s) in question.

Bildungsroman

In literary criticism, coming-of-age novels and Bildungsroman are sometimes interchangeable, but the former is usually a wider genre. The Bildungsroman (from the German words Bildung, "education", alternatively "forming" and Roman, "novel") is further characterized by a number of formal, topical, and thematic features. It focuses on the psychological and moral growth of the protagonist from childhood to adulthood (coming of age), in which character change is important.

The genre evolved from folk tales of young children exploring the world to find their fortune. Although the Bildungsroman arose in Germany, it has had extensive influence first in Europe and later throughout the world. Thomas Carlyle translated Goethe's novel into English, and after its publication in 1824, many British authors wrote novels inspired by it.

Many variations of the Bildungsroman exist, such as the Künstlerroman ("artist novel"), which focuses on the self-growth of an artist.

Teen films
In film, coming-of-age is a genre of teen films. Coming-of-age films focus on the psychological and moral growth or transition of a protagonist from youth to adulthood. A variant in the 2020s is the "delayed-coming-of-age film, a kind of story that acknowledges the deferred nature of 21st-century adulthood", in which young adults may still be exploring short-term relationships, living situations, and jobs even into their late 20s and early 30s.

Personal growth and change is an important characteristic of the genre, which relies on dialogue and emotional responses, rather than action. The story is sometimes told in the form of a flashback. Historically, coming-of-age films usually centred on young boys, although coming-of-age films focusing on girls have become more common in the early 21st century, such as The Poker House (2008), Winter's Bone (2010), Hick (2011), Girlhood (2014), Mustang (2015), The Diary of a Teenage Girl (2015), Mistress America (2015), The Edge of Seventeen (2016), Lady Bird (2017), Sweet 20 (2017), Aftersun (2022).

See also 
 List of coming-of-age stories

References 

 
Film genres
Literary genres
Works about adolescence